Solander Point is at the north end of the west-southwestern ridgeline of Endeavour crater on the planet Mars. It is named after the Swedish scientist Daniel Solander, who was the first university-educated scientist to set foot on Australian soil at Botany Bay in 1770.

Solander Point was visited in 2013 by the Mars Exploration Rover-B Opportunity, a robotic rover that was active on Mars from 2004-2018. 

By early July 2013 Opportunity was approaching it from the North, after previously examining outcrops on the northwest edge of the crater, north of Solander. The rover drove south from Cape York through Botany Bay to travel to Solander. By July 2, 2013, it was about half-way there. The area was imaged from Martian orbit by HiRISE on July 8, 2013, data which aids the rover team in understanding the terrain and planning rover traverses. The rover has been making good time on its approach to Solander, giving the opportunity to investigate a curious area of terrain in the crater. At the start of August, the rover was less than 100 meters (328 ft) from Solander, and arrived at its base in the following days. Its arrival signaled the availability of a northward facing slope, useful for angling to collect more sunlight during the Martian winter.  In October and November 2013, the rover climbed up the north end of Solander. By December 2013, the rover reached the top of Solander point hill as the 10 year anniversary of its landing on Mars neared. After Solander point Opportunity moved along Murray Ridge, and then south to Cape Tribulation.

Between Solander Point and, to north of it Cape York, both of which are raised up, is a lower area that is noted to be a part of the Burns Formation. The Burns Formation extends all the way back to Opportunity's landing site by Eagle crater, and it was heavily studied prior to this time by the rover. The Burns Formation is "high in sulfate bearing minerals" according to NASA. Solander Point lies at the geological contact line between the Burns Formation, and what is thought to be an even older geological region.

Solander point

Map showing journey of MER-B near Solander Point

Geological regions around Solander

Rover views of Solander

See also
Cape York (Mars)
Endeavour crater
Opportunity mission timeline

References

External links
Opportunity Heads Toward Next Destination, 'Solander Point' - NASA
Mars Rover Opportunity Trekking Toward More Layers - NASA (June 7, 2013)
Gallery
View From Orbit Showing Opportunity in 'Botany Bay' (view includes Solander Point)
HRSC - Western ridge of Endeavour
The Road To Endeavour - July 19, 2013
The Planetary Society - Field Report From Mars: Sol 3378 - July 25, 2013
Westward view
Animation at The Planetary Society
K. Kremer - "NASA’s Resilient Opportunity Rover Starts Martian Mountaineering" - Universe Today
Traverse map on Sol 3600(March 14, 2014)
A view of Solander Point from Botany Bay

Margaritifer Sinus quadrangle
Mars Exploration Rover mission